Christopher James Green (born 1 October 1993) is a South African-Australian cricketer. Green bowls right-arm off-break and bats right-handed, playing as an All-rounder. He plays for New South Wales and the Sydney Thunder in the Big Bash League. He also plays Sydney Grade Cricket for Northern District Cricket Club. Green made his Thunder debut in the final round of the BBL04.

T20 career
Ahead of the 2018 Caribbean Premier League, he was named as one of five players to watch in the tournament. In June 2019, he was selected to play for the Toronto Nationals franchise team in the 2019 Global T20 Canada tournament. In the 2020 IPL auction, he was bought by the Kolkata Knight Riders ahead of the 2020 Indian Premier League.

Green received a 90-day suspension for bowling with an illegal action commencing 8 January 2020. In July 2020, Green was named as the captain of the Guyana Amazon Warriors side ahead of the 2020 Caribbean Premier League. On 11 June 2021, in the 2021 T20 Blast in England, Green took a hat-trick and a five-wicket haul for Middlesex. In July 2022, he was signed by the Kandy Falcons for the third edition of the Lanka Premier League.

Personal life
Green is South African on his father's side and British on his mother's side. His parents Warren and Lisa Green (Gould), were both professional tennis players. Green holds a British passport.

References

External links
 

1993 births
Living people
Australian cricketers
New South Wales cricketers
Sydney Thunder cricketers
Lahore Qalandars cricketers
Multan Sultans cricketers
Cricketers from Durban
Guyana Amazon Warriors cricketers
Jamaica Tallawahs cricketers
Warwickshire cricketers
Middlesex cricketers
Kolkata Knight Riders cricketers
South African emigrants to Australia
English cricketers
British people of South African descent
British emigrants to Australia